Ariadna is a genus of tube-dwelling spider.

People
Ariadna Cabrol (born 1982), a Spanish actress and model
Ariadna Chasovnikova (1918/19–1988), a Kazakh-Soviet politician
Ariadna Gil (born 1969), a Spanish actress
Ariadna Gutiérrez (born 1993), a Colombian actress and model
Ariadna Gutiérrez (cyclist) (born 1991), a Mexican professional racing cyclist
Ariadna Medina (born 1972), a Mexican synchronized swimmer 
Ariadna Nevado (born 2000), a Spanish professional racing cyclist
Ariadna Romero (born 1986), a Cuban model and actress
Ariadna Scriabina (1905–1944), a Russian poet and activist of the French Resistance
Ariadna Shengelaya (born 1937), a Soviet actress
Ariadna Sintes (born 1986), a Cuban-Spanish actress
Ariadna Tudel Cuberes (born 1978), an Andorran road cyclist and ski mountaineer
Ariadna Tyrkova-Williams (1869–1962), a politician, journalist, writer and feminist
Ariadne Welter (1930–1998), a Mexican movie actress 
Thalía (Ariadna Thalía Sodi Miranda, born 1971), a Mexican singer and entrepreneur

Other uses
AMSD Ariadna, a Russian web browser
Ariadna abandonada, a sculpture by Fidencio Lucano Nava

See also

Ariadne (disambiguation)
Ariana (disambiguation)
Arianna (disambiguation)
Ariane (disambiguation)